The George Washington Book Prize was instituted in 2005 and is awarded annually to the best book on the founding era of the United States; especially ones that have the potential to advance broad public understanding of American history. It is administered by Washington College’s C.V. Starr Center for the Study of the American Experience; it is sponsored by Washington College in partnership with the Gilder Lehrman Institute of American History and George Washington's Mount Vernon. At $50,000, the George Washington Book Prize is one of the largest book awards in the United States.

Each year the sponsors appoint a jury of three historians or other qualified scholars who are asked to read all submitted books and narrow the field to three finalists. The finalists are announced at Washington College on or near George Washington's birthday in February. A seven-member committee, made up of two representatives of each of the three sponsoring institutions plus an independent historian, reviews the finalists and chooses a winner. The winner is announced at a gala dinner at Mount Vernon each May that honors the finalists.

Sponsoring organizations
Established in 2000 with a grant from the New York-based Starr Foundation, the C.V. Starr Center for the Study of the American Experience draws on the special historical strengths of Washington College and the Eastern Shore of Maryland. Through educational programs, scholarship, and public outreach, the Starr Center explores the early republic, the rise of democracy, and the manifold ways in which the founding era continues to shape United States  culture. In partnership with other institutions and with leading scholars and writers, the center works to promote innovative approaches to the study of history, and to bridge the gaps between historians, contemporary policymakers, and the general public. Washington College was founded in 1782 under the patronage of George Washington, and was the first college chartered in the new nation.

Founded in 1994, the Gilder Lehrman Institute of American History promotes the study and love of American history among audiences ranging from students to scholars to the general public. It creates history-centered schools and academic research centers, organizes seminars and enrichment programs for educators, produces print and electronic publications and traveling exhibitions, and sponsors lectures by eminent historians. In addition to the George Washington Book Prize, the institute also sponsors the Lincoln Prize in conjunction with the Civil War Institute at Gettysburg College, and the Frederick Douglass Prize in cooperation with the Gilder Lehrman Center for the Study of Slavery, Resistance, and Abolition at Yale University.

George Washington's Mount Vernon Estate and Gardens, open to the public since 1858, communicates the character and leadership of Washington to millions of Americans each year through a variety of interpretive programs on the Estate and in classrooms across the nation. Mount Vernon is owned and operated by the Mount Vernon Ladies' Association, founded in 1853, making it the oldest national preservation organization in the United States. The George Washington Book Prize is an important element of the Association's outreach program, which engages millions of teachers and students throughout the nation.

Table of Past Winners

Table of Past Finalists 
 = winner

References

External links
George Washington Book Prize
C.V. Starr Center for the Study of the American Experience
Gilder Lehrman Institute of American History
George Washington's Mount Vernon Estate & Gardens
Washington College Home Page
Marcus Rediker's home page

Awards established in 2005
American non-fiction literary awards